The South American gecko (Gonatodes eladioi) is a species of lizard in the family Sphaerodactylidae. The species is endemic to Brazil.

Etymology
The specific name, eladioi, is in honor of Brazilian zoologist Eladio da Cruz Lima (1900–1943).

Geographic range
Gonatodes eladioi is found in the Brazilian states of Mato Grosso and Pará.

Habitat
The preferred natural habitat of G. eladioi is forest.

Description

Behavior
Gonatodes eladioi is diurnal.

Reproduction
Gonatodes eladioi is oviparous.

References

Further reading
Ávila-Pires TCS (1995). "Lizards of Brazilian Amazonia (Reptilia: Squamata)". Zoologische Verhandelingen (299): 1–706. (Gonatodes eladioi, p. 264).
Gamble T, Simons AM, Colli GR, Vitt LJ (2008). "Tertiary climate change and the diversification of the Amazonian gecko genus Gonatodes (Sphaerodactylidae, Squamata)". Molecular Phylogenetics and Evolution  46 (1): 269–277.
Nascimento FP, Ávila-Pires TCS, Cunha OR (1987). "Os repteis da area de Carajas, Pará, Brasil (Squamata)". Boletim do Museu Paraense Emilio Goeldi, Nova Serie Zoologia 3 (1): 33–65. (Gonatodes eladioi, new species). (in Portuguese).
Rösler H (2000). "Kommentierte Liste der rezent, subrezent und fossil bekannten Geckotaxa (Reptilia: Gekkonomorpha)". Gekkota 2: 28–153. (Gonatodes eladioi, p. 84). (in German).

Gonatodes
Reptiles described in 1987